The 1995 international cricket season was from April 1995 to September 1995.

Season overview

West Indies in England

References

1995 in cricket